Karen Hauer Wyn-Jones (formerly Clifton; born 20 April 1982) is a Venezuelan-American professional Latin dance specialist and World Mambo Champion, best known for her appearances on the British television series Strictly Come Dancing. She is currently the longest serving professional dancer on the show. She also featured on the American TV series So You Think You Can Dance, and was a principal dancer in the touring live dance show Burn the Floor.

So You Think You Can Dance
In 2009, Hauer auditioned for season 6 of the US reality show So You Think You Can Dance. She originally auditioned with her husband at the time, Matthew Hauer, but he was eliminated during Vegas week while Karen moved on to the top 20.

Strictly Come Dancing

Hauer joined Strictly Come Dancing as a professional dancer in 2012, partnering Westlife singer Nicky Byrne. They reached the quarter-finals in week 10, before losing the dance-off to Denise van Outen and her partner James Jordan.

Hauer returned for series 11 in 2013 to partner television chef Dave Myers; they were voted out of the competition in week 7, after losing the dance-off to Mark Benton and Iveta Lukosiute. 

In series 12, she was paired with television personality Mark Wright, and they made it to the final, coming in 4th place. 

In series 13, she was partnered with broadcaster Jeremy Vine; they were eliminated in Week 8 after losing a dance-off with Jamelia and Tristan MacManus.

For the fourteenth series in 2016, Hauer was paired with the singer Will Young, who withdrew from the competition after the third week.

In 2016, Hauer won the Children in Need Special with the taekwondo athlete Lutalo Muhammad. She danced with the celebrity chef Ainsley Harriott for the 2016 Christmas special. 

In the fifteenth series in 2017, Hauer partnered television chef Simon Rimmer; they were eliminated in 11th place.

She was paired with actor Charles Venn for the sixteenth series in 2018; they reached the quarter-finals. 

During the seventeenth series in 2019, Hauer was partnered with comedian Chris Ramsey; they reached the semi-final.

In the eighteenth series in 2020, she was partnered with Made in Chelsea star Jamie Laing, who returned after injuring his foot in the previous series. With Laing, Hauer reached the final for the second time.

For the nineteenth series in 2021, she was partnered with actor Greg Wise. The couple were eliminated in Week 4. With Hauer returning for her eleventh series, she would now serve as the longest-serving female professional dancer in the history of Strictly Come Dancing.

For the twentieth series in 2022, she was partnered with comedienne Jayde Adams. The couple were eliminated in Week 4 after losing their dance off to Molly Rainford and Carlos Gu.

Highest and lowest scoring performances per dance

Jeremy Vine and Will Young are the only celebrities not to appear on this list.

Series 10: with celebrity partner Nicky Byrne

Series 11: with celebrity partner Dave Myers

Series 12: with celebrity partner Mark Wright

Score awarded by guest judge Donny Osmond

Series 13: with celebrity partner Jeremy Vine
In 2015 she partnered BBC Radio 2 presenter Jeremy Vine, for the thirteenth series of the show.

Series 14: with celebrity partner Will Young
She partnered singer Will Young, for the fourteenth series of the show.

Series 15: with celebrity partner Simon Rimmer
She partnered chef Simon Rimmer, for the fifteenth series of the show.

Series 16: with celebrity partner Charles Venn
She partnered actor Charles Venn, for the sixteenth series of the show.

Score awarded by guest judge Alfonso Ribeiro

Series 17: with celebrity partner Chris Ramsey
She was partnered with comedian Chris Ramsey, for the seventeenth series. The couple reached the semi-final and finished fourth.

Score awarded by guest judge Alfonso Ribeiro

Series 18: with celebrity partner Jamie Laing

 Score awarded by Anton Du Beke

Series 19: with celebrity partner Greg Wise

Series 20: with celebrity partner Jayde Adams

Dance tours and other professional engagements 
In August 2017, Karen & Kevin Clifton announced they would be touring the UK again in 2018 with their theatre tour, following the sell out success of their first nationwide tour in 2017.

In July 2022, Hauer announced that she would be teaching & performing with Gorka Marquez at Donahey's 'Dancing with The Stars Weekends' in 2023.

Hauer has performed on the Strictly Come Dancing Live! tour several times, either with a partner or as an additional dancer.

In 2020, Hauer's 'Firedance' tour with Gorka Marquez was postponed after a number of performances due to the Covid-19 pandemic.

Personal life 
Hauer was born Karen Vanessa Girez Kardenez Andreas, in Valencia, Venezuela, and took up dancing after moving to New York when she was eight. She studied at the Martha Graham School of Contemporary Dance, and then the High School of Performing Arts (otherwise known as "The Fame School"), majoring in ballet and contemporary dance before going on to study Ballroom and Latin at the age of 19.

Hauer was named World Mambo Champion in 2008, and Professional American Rhythm Rising Star Champion in 2009.

Hauer became the longest serving female professional dancer on Strictly Come Dancing when she was confirmed to appear in her tenth series in 2021.

Hauer is a certified Personal Trainer and a health and fitness enthusiast, and in 2019 she launched her online fitness programme 'Hauer Power'.

Hauer has been married three times: first to former dance partner Matthew Hauer (until 2009), then to fellow professional dancer Kevin Clifton (2015-2018) and latterly to Jordan Wyn-Jones (since 2022).

References

External links
Strictly Come Dancing Biogs.com

1982 births
Living people
Venezuelan female dancers
People from Valencia, Venezuela
Venezuelan emigrants to the United States
Venezuelan expatriates in England
American expatriates in England